The 2011–12 Tour de Ski was the sixth edition of the Tour de Ski and took place from 29 December 2011 to 8 January 2012. The race started in Oberhof, Germany, and ended in Val di Fiemme, Italy. The defending champions were Dario Cologna of Switzerland for the men and Poland's Justyna Kowalczyk (two-time defending champion) for the women. Both Cologna and Kowalczyk were able to defend their titles as Tour de Ski champions and became the first athletes ever to win the Tour three times.

Schedule

Final standings

Overall standings

Sprint standings

Stages

Stage 1
29 December 2011, Oberhof, Germany - prologue

Stage 2
30 December 2011, Oberhof - pursuit (handicap start)

Stage 3
31 December 2011, Oberstdorf, Germany

Stage 4
1 January 2012, Oberstdorf - skiathlon

Stage 5
3 January 2012, Toblach, Italy - distance

Stage 6
4 January 2012, Toblach, Italy - sprint

Stage 7
5 January 2012, Cortina d'Ampezzo-Toblach - distance (handicap start)

Stage 8
7 January 2012, Val di Fiemme, Italy - distance (mass start)

Stage 9
8 January 2012, Val di Fiemme - distance (handicap start)

References

External links

2011–12 FIS Cross-Country World Cup
2011 12
2012 in cross-country skiing
December 2011 sports events in Europe
January 2012 sports events in Europe